The 1896 Notre Dame football team was an American football team that represented the University of Notre Dame in the 1896 college football season. Frank E. Hering was the team's captain and coach.  The team compiled a 4–3 record, shut out four opponents, and outscored its opponents by a combined total of 160 to 50.

Schedule

References

Notre Dame
Notre Dame Fighting Irish football seasons
Notre Dame football